1731 The Gentleman's Magazine (London) – appeared until 1907
1785 The Daily Universal Register later The Times (London)
1791 The Observer
1821 The Manchester Guardian
1827 In New York the first 'black' newspaper in the United States, Freedom's Journal, is founded.
1831 William Lloyd Garrison founds The Liberator, which opposed uncompromisingly Slavery - appeared until 1865
1838 The Bombay Times and Journal of Commerce, since 1861 The Times of India, today the English newspaper with the widest circulation, is founded
1843 The Economist
1851 The New-York Daily Times, later The New York Times
1857 Ralph Waldo Emerson and other writers found in Boston The Atlantic Monthly
1884 Financial News later Financial Times (London)
1886 Cosmopolitan
1888 The National Geographic Society (United States) is founded and starts to publish The National Geographic Magazine, later National Geographic
1889 Foundation of The Wall Street Journal in New York City
1895 Foundation of the American Historical Review (United States)
1906 Emma Goldman founds her magazine Mother Earth - appeared until 1917
1909 Foundation of the oldest Afro-American newspaper in the United States still being published - Amsterdam News (New York)
1909 Charlotte Perkins Gilman founds her feminist magazine  The Forerunner - appeared until 1916
1911 Foundation of the Daily Herald, in Hollywood the first film studios are being opened
1914 the Times Literary Supplement becomes an independent publication
1922 British Broadcasting Corporation (BBC)
1922 Foundation of  Reader's Digest -  The conservative magazine is published in 19 languages and has about  100 million readers.
1923  Henry Luce and Briton Hadden found  in New York City the magazine TIME
1926 NBC is founded as a radio network by  RCA, General Electric and Westinghouse Electric Corporation.
1927 CBS, first only a radio station, starts to broadcast its regular television program in New York City on July 21, 1931.
1933 Foundation of Newsweek and U.S. News & World Report (United States)
1934 Foundation of Partisan Review (United States, appeared until 2003)
1936 Henry Luce founds Life in New York.
1938 the council communist magazine International Council Correspondence changes its name to Living Marxism. In 1942 it becomes New Essays. Its editor since 1934 had been Paul Mattick.
1945 Foundation of Commentary, published on behalf of the  American Jewish Committee. it later became a leading neo-conservative publication.
1945 John H. Johnson founds Ebony, a popular afroamerican magazine still in publication
1946 Foundation of Far Eastern Economic Review (Hong Kong)
1953 Hugh Hefner founds Playboy (first only in the United States)
1955 In New York  Dan Wolf, Ed Fancher and Norman Mailer found the alternative weekly The Village Voice.
 1956 Phyllis Lyon and Del Martin found The Ladder, one of the first lesbian magazines in the United States.
1956 Drum Magazine (South Africa)
1959 The Manchester Guardian becomes  The Guardian.
1960 New Left Review
1964 International Publishing Corporation starts the publication of the tabloid The Sun to replace Daily Herald.
1965  Cosmopolitan is transformed into a women's magazine. Its new trademark is a 'sexily' dressed women on the front cover.
1969 In the United States, the Public Broadcasting Service (PBS) is founded.
1972 Foundation of the first feminist film magazine Women and Film (Santa Monica, United States) – appeared until 1975
1972 Gloria Steinem founds the popular feminist magazine Ms. magazine (United States)
1972 In the United States the pay TV station Home Box Office starts broadcasting, since 1975 it's also available via satellite.
1972 In New York the Downtown Community Television (DCTV) Center is founded. The aim of the organization in the beginning was to empower less privileged groups to produce their own political videos. The productions of the DCTV today reach up to 100 million spectators every year.
1972 In the United States the film distributor Women Make Movies gegründet.
1974 Larry Flynt founds the pornographic magazine Hustler.
1975 Signs. Journal of Women and Culture in Society, one of the first and most renowned academic feminist journals is founded in the United States
1976 Philadelphia Gay News is founded as a weekly publication for the LGBT community
1979 London Review of Books
1980 Ted Turner founds CNN (United States).
1981 Rupert Murdoch's firm News International buys The Times.
1981 MTV starts broadcasting.
1982 In Great Britain Channel 4 is founded
1983 Foundation of The Jakarta Post (Indonesia)
1983 The Wall Street Journal Europe
1985 Viacom buys  Warner-Amex Satellite Entertainment and therefore also MTV
1986 General Electric kauft die Radio Corporation of America (RCA) und damit auch deren Tochter NBC
1986 In Great Britain the newspaper The Independent is founded
1987 In the United States: Michael Albert and Lydia Sargent,  two of the founders of South End Press, found the leftist  Z Magazine.
 1994 In Great Britain the music magazine Mojo is founded.
1995 Westinghouse Electric Corporation buys CBS, paying 5,4 billion Dollars.
1995 Website Z Net.
1996 Fox News Channel starts broadcasting (United States).
1999 Foundation of Indymedia (also in other languages)

Bibliography
Erik Barnouw, Tube of Plenty: The Evolution of American Television, Oxford University Press 1992
Rodger Streitmatter, Voices of Revolution: The Dissident Press in America, Paperback Edition,  Columbia University Press 2001
Rodger Streitmatter, Unspeakable: The Rise of the Gay and Lesbian Press in America, Faber & Faber 1995
Rodger Streitmatter, Raising Her Voice. African American Women Journalists who changed History,  University Press of Kentucky  1994

See also

Historiography - this article includes a chronological  list of historiographical journals

Media in English